Albizia lebbeck is a species of plant in the family Fabaceae, native to the Indian subcontinent and Myanmar. It is widely cultivated and naturalised in other tropical and subtropical regions, including Australia. Common names in English include siris, Indian siris, East Indian walnut, Broome raintree, lebbeck, lebbek tree, frywood, koko and woman's tongue tree. The latter name is a play on the sound the seeds make as they rattle inside the pods. Siris is also a common name of the genus Albizia.

Description
It is a tree growing to a height of 18–30 m tall with a trunk 50 cm to 1 m in diameter. The leaves are bipinnate, 7.5–15 cm long, with one to four pairs of pinnae, each pinna with 6–18 leaflets. The flowers are white, with numerous 2.5–3.8 cm long stamens, and very fragrant. The fruit is a pod 15–30 cm long and 2.5-5.0 cm broad, containing six to twelve seeds.

Name
Mimosa speciosa as described by Nikolaus Joseph von Jacquin refers to Albizia lebbeck. The Mimosa speciosa of Carl Peter Thunberg, however, is Albizia julibrissin. The name Lebbeck is from Arabic.

In Tamil Nadu , the tree is known as 'vaagai' as the ancient kings of the Sangam Age had worn the garland made by this flower to celebrate victory in battles , with the word 'vaagai' meaning 'victory' in Tamil.

In the West Indies and certain parts of South America this tree is known as a 'Shak Shak Tree' because of the sound the seeds make in the pod.

Uses 
Its uses include environmental management,  forage, medicine and wood.  It is cultivated as a shade tree in North and South America. In India and Pakistan, the tree is used to produce timber. Wood from Albizia lebbeck has a density of 0.55-0.66 g/cm3 or higher.

Even where it is not native, some indigenous herbivores are liable to utilize lebbeck as a food resource. For example, the greater rhea (Rhea americana) has been observed feeding on it in the cerrado of Brazil.

Ethnobotany
Lebbeck is an astringent, also used by some cultures to treat boils, cough, to treat the eye, flu, gingivitis, lung problems, pectoral problems, is used as a tonic, and is used to treat abdominal tumors. The bark is used medicinally to treat inflammation. This information was obtained via ethnobotanical records, which are a reference to how a plant is used by indigenous peoples, not verifiable, scientific or medical evaluation of the effectiveness of these claims. Albizia lebbeck is also psychoactive..It is also very effective in migraine.

Taxonomy
The taxonomic history of A. lebbeck is somewhat convoluted. It was originally described by Carl Linnaeus as Mimosa lebbeck. In its original description the Mimosa lebbeck was a large Acacia tree that grew in Egypt. George Bentham placed the species in its present genus, but other authors believed that the plant described by Linnaeus was the related Albizia kalkora as described by Prain (based on the Mimosa kalkora of William Roxburgh), and erroneously referred to this species as Albizia lebbeck. However, Francisco Manuel Blanco used Mimosa lebbeck to refer to Albizia retusa ssp. retusa. In addition, the specific epithet is occasionally misspelled lebbek.

Junior synonyms are:
 Acacia lebbeck (L.) Willd.
 Acacia macrophylla Bunge
 Acacia speciosa (Jacq.) Willd.
 Albizia latifolia B.Boivin
 Albizia lebbeck (L.) Benth. var. leucoxylon Hassk.
 Albizia lebbeck (L.) Benth. var. pubescens Haines
 Albizia lebbeck (L.) Benth. var. rostrata Haines
Albizia rostrata Miq. is Archidendron globosum.
 Feuilleea lebbeck (L.) Kuntze
 Inga borbonica Hassk.
 Inga leucoxylon Hassk.
 Mimosa lebbeck L.
 Mimosa lebbek L. (orth.var.)
 Mimosa sirissa Roxb.
 Mimosa speciosa Jacq.
Mimosa speciosa Thunb. is Albizia julibrissin.
 Pithecellobium splitgerberianum Miq.

Independently, there also exists a genus named Lebeckia, whose range is restricted to South Africa. It is also a legume, but a member of the Faboideae, a different legume subfamily.

Footnotes

References 
  (1973): Albizia lebbeck (L.) Benth.. In: Flora of Pakistan (Vol. 36: Mimosaceae). University of Karachi, Karachi. HTML fulltext
  (1997): Appendix 1 - List of wood densities for tree species from tropical America, Africa, and Asia. In: Estimating Biomass and Biomass Change of Tropical Forests: a Primer. FAO Forestry Papers 134.  HTML fulltext
  (2008): Dr. Duke's Phytochemical and Ethnobotanical Databases - Albizia lebbeck. Retrieved 2008-FEB-23.
  (2005): Albizia lebbeck (L.) Benth.. Version 10.01, November 2005. Retrieved 2008-MAR-30.
  (1994): 2.5 Albizia lebbeck - a Promising Forage Tree for Semiarid Regions. In: : Forage Tree Legumes in Tropical Agriculture. CAB Intemational. HTML fulltext
  (2004): Enzyklopädie der psychoaktiven Pflanzen, Botanik, Ethnopharmakologie und Anwendungen (7th ed.). AT Verlag. 
  (2006): The fishing rhea: a new food item in the diet of wild greater rheas (Rhea americana, Rheidae, Aves). Revista Brasileira de Ornitologia 14(3): 285-287 [English with Portuguese abstract]. PDF fulltext

External links

Albizia lebbeck List of Chemicals (Dr. Duke's Databases)
 

lebbeck
Medicinal plants of Asia
Medicinal plants of Oceania
Forages
Eudicots of Western Australia
Trees of the Indian subcontinent
Flora of Myanmar
Bushfood
Plants described in 1753
Taxa named by Carl Linnaeus